Tony Rachaun Bobbitt (born October 22, 1979) is an American professional basketball player.

Bobbitt played alongside National Basketball Association (NBA) player Vince Carter at Daytona Beach Mainland High School, where he graduated in 1999. Bobbitt played for the College of Southern Idaho (NJCAA) from 2000 to 2002 and then transferred to the University of Cincinnati for his junior and senior years. As a senior with the Bearcats, Bobbitt averaged 13.3 points per games and was named third-team all-conference in Conference USA, becoming just the third reserve in the league's then-nine year history to earn all-conference honors. He was signed as an undrafted free agent by the Los Angeles Lakers in January 2005, playing 2 games for them during the 2004–05 NBA season.

References

External links
Career at Eurobasket.com

1979 births
Living people
American expatriate basketball people in Cyprus
American expatriate basketball people in Germany
American expatriate basketball people in Italy
American expatriate basketball people in Mexico
American men's basketball players
Bakersfield Jam players
Basketball players from Florida
Cincinnati Bearcats men's basketball players
Colorado 14ers players
Eisbären Bremerhaven players
Huracanes de Tampico players
Idaho Stampede players
Los Angeles Lakers players
Maine Red Claws players
Mainland High School alumni
Shooting guards
Southern Idaho Golden Eagles men's basketball players
Sportspeople from Daytona Beach, Florida
Springfield Armor players
Undrafted National Basketball Association players